Morrill is an unincorporated community in Morrill Township, Morrison County, Minnesota, United States.  The community is located near the junction of 330th Avenue and Morrison County Road 26, Nature Road.  Nearby places include Pierz, Hillman, Little Rock, Ramey, and Foley.

The community was named for Ashby C. Morrill, a county official.

References

Unincorporated communities in Morrison County, Minnesota
Unincorporated communities in Minnesota